Tortolita may refer to:

Tortolita Mountains, Arizona
Tortolita, Arizona, a census-designated place